Association Sportive Étaples is a football club located in Étaples, France. It competes in the Régional 2, the seventh tier of French football, as of the 2021–22 season. The club's colours are yellow and blue and its home ground is the Stade François Guilluy.

The club has competed numerous times in the Coupe de France, notably reaching the seventh round of the tournament in the 2016–17 season before losing 2–0 to Ligue 2 side Valenciennes.

References

External links 
 Club website
 AS Étaples on Global Sports Archive
 AS Étaples on FBref.com

Football clubs in France
Sport in Pas-de-Calais
Association football clubs established in 1937
1937 establishments in France
Football clubs in Hauts-de-France